Maurice de Gandillac (14 February 1906 – 18 April 2006) was a French philosopher. He was born in Koléa, French Algeria and died in Neuilly-sur-Seine, France.

He wrote his thesis under Étienne Gilson on the Renaissance philosopher Nicholas of Cusa. In 1946 he  was appointed professor in the history of medieval and Renaissance philosophy at the Sorbonne.
He supervised the doctoral dissertations of numerous students, including Louis Althusser, Jean-François Lyotard, Gilles Deleuze, Michel Foucault, and Jacques Derrida.

Notes

1906 births
2006 deaths
École Normale Supérieure alumni
French centenarians
Academic staff of the University of Paris
Historians of philosophy
People affiliated with Action Française
Translators of Friedrich Nietzsche
Men centenarians